Sebastjan Gobec (born 6 December 1979 in Celje) is a retired Slovenian football defender. He is the all-time most capped player in the Slovenian PrvaLiga with 488 appearances.

Club career
Gobec started his career at Celje's youth sides. He made his first team debut on 2 March 1997 in a league match against Primorje. In following two seasons he established himself as a first team regular. In December 2007 he left Celje after 10 seasons and signed with Sint-Truidense V.V. He played twelve matches and scored one goal in the Belgian First Division. In June 2008, he returned to Celje.

International career
Gobec played two matches for Slovenia. He made his international debut on 9 February 2005 in a friendly against Czech Republic.

Honours
Celje
Slovenian Cup: 2004–05

References

External links
Player profile at NZS 

1979 births
Living people
Sportspeople from Celje
Slovenian footballers
Association football midfielders
NK Celje players
Slovenian PrvaLiga players
Slovenian expatriate footballers
Slovenian expatriate sportspeople in Belgium
Expatriate footballers in Belgium
Sint-Truidense V.V. players
Slovenia under-21 international footballers
Slovenia international footballers
Slovenia youth international footballers